Sherie Weil, known professionally as Kim Carson, is an American radio personality.

She was born in Detroit, Michigan and graduated from Denby High School.

Carson was the first full-time female air personality at a number of stations she worked at including 93FM WDRQ/Detroit. She was also awarded "Best Nighttime Radio Personality" in Detroit, and was named the 1st Place winner in the Detroit Celebrity Grand Prix.  After her stint at WDRQ, she moved to WCZY-FM,(Detroit), now WKQI.  There she was the first full-time female radio host hired by Gannett.

Carson has worked at radio stations in Detroit including WCSX, WYCD, WDTX, WDFX, and WOW-FM. She has also worked at WKVQ, Knoxville, Tennessee; WROK, Rockford, Illinois; KJYO, Oklahoma City, Oklahoma; WXSS/WAMG, Milwaukee, Wisconsin; WMAG, Greensboro, N.C., and WVKS, WWWM, WRVF (where she was host of the nighttime love songs show, The Quiet Storm), and WDMN, Toledo, Ohio. Most recently Carson handled the midday shift, 10am-3pm and Music Director duties at 95.7 WLHT and WTRV
in Grand Rapids, Michigan. She left WTRV on May 31, 2012 after a nine-year stint on the Grand Rapids airwaves. Carson also hosts an inspirational show, Faith, Hope and Love Songs, which has been airing on radio stations since September 2002. From 2013 to 2017 Carson was on WLAV middays,  10am-3pm. Carson left WLAV and started WVFM in Kalamazoo doing morning drive. Her first show on the air, The Kim Carson Show started March 27, 2017

Carson is the author of Essence of Life: A Compilation of Inspiration and Poem.  She is currently living in Grand Rapids, Michigan  Kim's show, Faith Hope And Love Songs will be coming to radio and via podcast soon.

External links
 

Living people
Radio personalities from Detroit
Year of birth missing (living people)
Denby High School alumni
American women radio journalists
21st-century American women